Doddadevarapadu is a village in Veerullapadu Mandal in Krishna District of Andhra Pradesh State, India. It is at the border of Andhra Pradesh and Telangana. It is located 124 km towards west from District headquarters Machilipatnam. Vijayawada, Jaggaiahpet, Nuzvid, are the nearby cities to Doddadevara padu.

References

Villages in Krishna district